The 2003 Missouri Valley Conference men's basketball tournament was played March 7–10, 2003, at the Savvis Center in St. Louis, Missouri at the conclusion of the 2002–2003 regular season. The Creighton Bluejays won their 8th MVC tournament title to earn an automatic bid to the 2003 NCAA tournament.

Tournament bracket

See also
 Missouri Valley Conference

References 

2002–03 Missouri Valley Conference men's basketball season
Missouri Valley Conference men's basketball tournament